This is a list of submissions to the 43rd Academy Awards for Best Foreign Language Film. The Academy Award for Best Foreign Language Film was created in 1956 by the Academy of Motion Picture Arts and Sciences to honour non-English-speaking films produced outside the United States. The award is handed out annually, and is accepted by the winning film's director, although it is considered an award for the submitting country as a whole. Countries are invited by the Academy to submit their best films for competition according to strict rules, with only one film being accepted from each country.

For the 43rd Academy Awards, thirteen films were submitted in the category Academy Award for Best Foreign Language Film. The titles highlighted in blue and yellow were the five nominated films, which came from Belgium, France, Italy, Spain and Switzerland. Italy ended up winning the award for crime drama Investigation of a Citizen Above Suspicion.

Submissionsrd

References

Sources
 Margaret Herrick Library, Academy of Motion Picture Arts and Sciences

43